George Burnett Batten (October 7, 1891 in Haddonfield, New Jersey – August 4, 1972 in New Port Richey, Florida) was an infielder in Major League Baseball. He went 0-for-3 in his one-game major league career on September 28, 1912.

External links

1891 births
1972 deaths
Major League Baseball second basemen
Baseball players from New Jersey
New York Highlanders players
People from Haddonfield, New Jersey
Sportspeople from Camden County, New Jersey